Paddy Prendergast may refer to:

 Paddy Prendergast (racehorse trainer) (1910–1980), Irish trainer
Paddy Prendergast (Gaelic footballer) (1925-2021), Irish Gaelic footballer
 Paddy Prendergast (hurler) (born 1958), Irish retired hurler

See also
 Patrick Prendergast (disambiguation)